The United Namib Independence Party was a political party in Namibia. It was founded in 1964 by the Herero Chiefs Council, after the HCC broke with the South West African National Union (SWANU).

References 

Defunct political parties in Namibia